British Rail Class D2/10 was a locomotive type commissioned by British Rail. It was a diesel-hydraulic shunting locomotive in the pre-TOPS period built by the North British Locomotive Company (NBL). The NBL/MAN engines were built by the North British Locomotive Company in Scotland under licence from the German company MAN. They were introduced in 1957 and numbered D2708-D2780.

After service with British Railways, D2767 was sold and in 1982 it was owned by Burmah Oil Trading Ltd., at Burmah Refinery in Stanlow. D2773 was sold to the National Coal Board, with it working in the South Wales Area at Cleynen South Colliery.

Preservation
Two locomotives are preserved:
 D2767 at Bo'ness and Kinneil Railway.
 D2774 at Strathspey Railway

Models
Two etched brass kits covering D2720-44 and D2745-80 is available in the range of Judith Edge Kits.

See also
List of British Rail classes

References

External links

 D2767 preserved at  Bo'ness

D002.10
NBL locomotives
B locomotives
Railway locomotives introduced in 1957
Standard gauge locomotives of Great Britain
Shunting locomotives